Siyah Nab (also Romanized as Sīyah Nāb; also known as Sīnābād and Sīnāb) is a village in Mehranrud-e Markazi Rural District, in the Central District of Bostanabad County, East Azerbaijan Province, Iran. At the 2006 census, its population was 843, with 184 families.

References 

Populated places in Bostanabad County